Habaja is a small borough in Kose Parish, Harju County in northern Estonia.

References

Boroughs and small boroughs in Estonia
Kreis Harrien